Ayer Rajah Bus Park was a bus depot located in Commonwealth, Singapore.

Ayer Rajah Bus Park was built on 10 April 1984 as the Commonwealth and Ayer Rajah began developed. The facility has ample parking space for 176 buses, relieving the need of overnight parking at Buona Vista Bus Terminal, Holland Road and Delta Fringe Carparks, and the occasional roadside parking at Leng Kee Road.

Prior to its closure, it also served as a turnaround point for service 91 from Buona Vista Bus Terminal.

With SBS Transit being awarded the Bukit Merah Bus Package in February 2018, several bus services were progressively transferred to the new Ulu Pandan Bus Depot in July and August that year. On 9 September that year, Ayer Rajah Bus Park ceased operations. Bus services previously garaged at Ayer Rajah Bus Park were transferred to either Bukit Batok Bus Depot or Ulu Pandan Bus Depot.

References

Bus stations in Singapore